The Internet Theatre Database (ITDb) is an online database with information about plays, playwrights, actors, legitimate theatre, musical theatre, Broadway shows, and similar theatrical information.

The website is run by several volunteer theatre aficionados, each contributing material as time permits. Somewhat similar to the Internet Broadway Database, the site's creators endeavor to include theatre outside of New York City by indexing London and Off-Broadway productions, national tours, and regional theatre. Modelled on the considerably larger Internet Movie Database, the site indexes by six categories: (1) show/play name; (2) people (actor, writer, or director); (3) theatre facility; (4) song title; (5) character/role; and (6) production role. Each day, the site also shows what well-known productions opened or closed on that date at important theatres in the past several decades.

As of July 2020, it has not been updated in over a decade.

See also
Internet Broadway Database (IBDb)
Internet Movie Database (IMDb)

References

External links
 

Theatrical organizations
Online databases
Theatre databases